Martin John Ferguson  (born 12 December 1953) is an Australian former Labor Party politician who was the Member of the House of Representatives for Batman from 1996 to 2013. He served as Minister for Resources and Energy and Minister for Tourism in the Rudd and Gillard Governments from 2007 to 2013.

Before entering Parliament, Ferguson spent a long career as a trade unionist, being General Secretary of the Federated Miscellaneous Workers' Union from 1984 to 1990 and President of the Australian Council of Trade Unions from 1990 to 1996. He is the son of Jack Ferguson who was Deputy Premier of New South Wales from 1976 to 1984. His brother is Laurie Ferguson, also a long-serving Labor MP.

Trade unionist
Born in Sydney to Jack Ferguson and Mary Ellen, Ferguson was educated at St Patrick's College, Strathfield, and the University of Sydney. After leaving university, he became a research officer at the Federated Miscellaneous Workers' Union, eventually rising to become Assistant General Secretary, and later General Secretary in 1984, during which time he was also appointed as a member of the Australian Council of Trade Unions (ACTU) executive board.

As FMWU General Secretary, and from 1985 to 1990 as Vice President of the ACTU, Ferguson worked closely alongside the likes of Bill Kelty and Simon Crean to negotiate with the Hawke-Keating Government the Prices and Incomes Accord. After Crean's election to the House of Representatives at the 1990 election, Ferguson was elected his replacement as ACTU President, and became a member of the Governing Body of the International Labour Organization. For his services to industrial relations in Australia, Ferguson was made a Member of the Order of Australia in 1996.

Political career

Ferguson won preselection for the safe Labor seat of Batman in 1995, after a deal was negotiated between the right-wing Labor Unity faction in Victoria and the ALP National Executive. At the local level, the majority Greek party membership, largely resulting from heavy branch stacking, was likely to support a candidate other than Ferguson, however no local candidate was likely to receive support from the 50 per cent vote in the preselection panel which had been elected by the Victorian ALP State Conference. The other candidates, Jenny Mikakos and Theo Theophanous, then members of competing Left factions, were forced to withdraw from a local preselection plebiscite in favour of Ferguson, as a result of these negotiations.

After his election to the House of Representatives in March 1996, new Opposition Leader Kim Beazley appointed Ferguson as Shadow Minister for Regional and Urban Development and Shadow Minister for Transport and Infrastructure. He remained in the Shadow Cabinet under the leaderships of Simon Crean, Mark Latham and Kevin Rudd. After the latter won the 2007 election, Ferguson was appointed Minister for Resources and Energy and Minister for Tourism. He continued in both roles after Julia Gillard succeeded Rudd as Prime Minister in June 2010, and resigned from both in March 2013, ahead of his retirement from Parliament that August.

Uranium debate
Ferguson is a supporter of uranium mining in Australia and in 2005, Ferguson addressed an Australian Uranium Conference and said "We as a community have to be part of the ever-complex question of how we clean up the world's climate. And part of that debate is going to be nuclear power".

The anti-nuclear movement in Australia is stronger than in other developed countries. Friends of the Earth have strongly opposed Ferguson's advocacy for expanding the export of uranium beyond the existing three-mine policy which Ferguson sought to overturn at the ALP's national conference in April 2007. The lobby group Northern Anti Nuclear Alliance has distributed 60,000 leaflets critical of his policy in his electorate of Batman. He also supported – in scientific terms – the proposal of former Prime Minister Bob Hawke for Australia to become the world's storage facility for nuclear waste although he said that it was politically not possible.

He told ABC Radio that it was wrong to ban uranium exports to the People's Republic of China: "The Labor Party adopts the view that we're open for investment. It's about economic growth and jobs in Australia. Is China to be treated any different to South Korea, Japan, France, United States? I don't think so. We don't have one rule for China in terms of overseas investment and economic growth and jobs and another rule for Japan".

Coal Seam Gas
In the lead up to the 2015 NSW state election, Ferguson criticised NSW Labor leader Luke Foley over his proposal to ban coal seam gas extraction.

A range of Labor figures doubled down on efforts to oust Ferguson from the party.

Privatisation
In 2015, Ferguson come out in support for the Liberal government plan to sell 49% of the government's electricity distributors. Ferguson even went further, saying he was "ashamed of the Party" and accusing Foley and the unions of "deliberately misleading the public, creating unnecessary fear and trying to scare people."

Career after politics 
Since leaving parliament in 2013, Ferguson has continued to advocate for Australia's tourism, energy and resources sector. As of 2019, Ferguson was the chairman of the Clare Valley Wine & Grape Association, the chairman of the advisory board of APPEA and has commercial interests in the sector as a non-executive director of Seven Group Holdings and BG Group. Since June 2015, Ferguson has also been Chair of Tourism Accommodation Australia (TAA).

In March 2020, Ferguson was appointed as a part-time Expert Panel member on the Fair Work Commission for the following five years.

On 19 May 2014, the Australian Labor Party's WA Executive endorsed a motion to expel Martin Ferguson from the Party. However he has refused to resign and continues to be a member.

See also
Ferguson Left
First Rudd Ministry

References

External links
Paydirt's Uranium Conference 2006

 

1953 births
Living people
20th-century Australian politicians
21st-century Australian politicians
Australian Labor Party members of the Parliament of Australia
Australian trade unionists
Government ministers of Australia
Labor Left politicians
Members of the Australian House of Representatives for Batman
Members of the Australian House of Representatives
Members of the Cabinet of Australia
Members of the Order of Australia
National Library of Australia Council members
People educated at St Patrick's College, Strathfield
Politicians from Sydney